The IV Cavalry Corps ( literally: Higher Cavalry Command 4) was a formation of the German Army in World War I. The corps was formed on mobilization of the German Army in August 1914 and dissolved in January 1915 as the onset of trench warfare negated the requirement for large cavalry formations.  It was commanded throughout its existence by General der Kavallerie Gustav Freiherr von Hollen.

Combat chronicle 
Initially on the Western Front with 3rd and 6th Cavalry Divisions preceding 4th and 5th Armies.  Transferred to the East on 14 November 1914.  Dissolved January 1915.

Order of Battle on mobilisation 
Initially, the Corps simply consisted of 2 Cavalry Divisions (with 2 Jäger battalions attached) without any Corps troops; in supply and administration matters, the Cavalry Divisions were entirely autonomous.  The commander was only concerned with tactics and strategy, hence his title of Senior Cavalry Commander Höherer Kavallerie-Kommandeur.

On formation in August 1914, the Corps consisted of:
3rd Cavalry Division
6th Cavalry Division
5th Jäger Battalion
6th Jäger Battalion

Each cavalry division consisted of 3 cavalry brigades (6 regiments each of 4 squadrons), a horse artillery battalion Abteilung (3 four-gun batteries), a machine gun detachment (company size, 6 MGs), plus pioneers, signals and a motor vehicle column.  A more detailed Table of Organisation and Equipment can be seen here.  The Jäger battalions each consisted of 4 light infantry companies, 1 machine gun company (6 MGs), 1 cyclist company and a motorised vehicle column.

Commanders 
IV Cavalry Corps was commanded throughout its existence by General der Kavallerie Gustav Freiherr von Hollen.

See also 

German Army (German Empire)
German Army order of battle (1914)
German cavalry in World War I
TOE, German Cavalry Division, August 1914

References

Bibliography 
 

Corps of Germany in World War I
Cavalry corps of Germany
Military units and formations established in 1914
Military units and formations disestablished in 1915